Selfless Records is a record label that releases punk rock music. The label was notable for putting out a number of albums that were covers of entire Ramones albums, including Leave Home, Ramones and Rocket to Russia.

Artists
Antischism
Big Boys
Dag Nasty
The Dicks
Dropdead
The Queers
Screeching Weasel
The Vindictives
The Mr T Experience

Punk record labels